Women's rights in Qatar are restricted by the country's male guardianship law - currently the only remaining country in the Gulf region with such laws - and influenced by the Wahhabi interpretation of Islam. Both women and men were enfranchised in the country at the same time, in 1999. Labour force participation rates of Qatari women are above the world average and among the highest in the Arab World, which comes mainly as a result of an increasing number of Qatari women who are attaining academic degrees.

There is limited mixing between the sexes and Qatari women in public are largely expected to wear traditional clothing which typically consists of an abaya and shayla, both of which partially conceal their appearance. Mouza Al Malki, a psychologist, claims that gender separation is influenced more so by cultural factors than religious factors. Women in Qatar must obtain permission from their male guardians to marry, study abroad on government scholarships, work in many government jobs, travel abroad until certain ages, receive some forms of reproductive health care and to act as a child's primary guardian, even when they are divorced.

History
Prior to the establishment of an urban society, Qatar was used as rangeland for nomadic tribes from the Najd and al-Hasa regions of Saudi Arabia. In Bedouin society, women were responsible for buying and selling goods on behalf of their tribe. Women often had to assume positions of decision-making within their tribe when men left their families for long stretches of time to participate in pearl hunting trips or to act as merchants.

They were separated from men within their own quarters in the tent or house. Education was regarded as unimportant and scarcely available for the majority of women in Bedouin tradition. On the other hand, children in urban areas were taught the Quran until the age of ten, after which the family would celebrate al khatma, the end of memorizing the Quran.

Industrial era
After the country began reaping the financial benefits of oil drilling operations in the 1950s and 1960s, an increasing number of women began receiving formal education. Kuwaiti journalist Hidayat Sultan Al Salem wrote of Qatari women's role in 1968:

There was a marked increase of women in the workforce during the early seventies.

Education

When the Qatari government established the Khalid Bin El Walid Boys School in 1951, a woman named Amna Mahmoud Al-Jaidah requested that the government open another school for girls. Her request was denied due to Qatari society heavily opposing the idea of girls learning to read and write. Despite the backlash, Amna Mahmoud created her own impromptu school within her house to educate the girls who would attend. In 1953 the Qatari government formally recognized Amna Mahmoud's school, making her the first female Qatari teacher in the first Qatari school for girls.

In 1957 after many changes, Amna Mahmoud's school became known as the Banat Al Doha Primary School and more than 100 female students were attending. Prior to the school's establishment, the only form of education that existed for women was religious education. A 1980–81 report by the Ministry of Education reported that there were 70 girls' schools, with 19,356 students, an increase from 50 female students in 1955.

The first university in Qatar was opened in 1973. It provided separate faculties for both men and women. Out of the 157 initial students, 103 of them were female. The ratio of female-to-male students remained steady over the proceeding years. Sheikha Abdulla Al-Misnad became the first female president of the university in 2003. Females accounted for more than 50% of the university's personnel in 2008. By 2012, there were almost twice as many female students enrolled in the university as there were males.

More than half of the Ministry of Education's employees are female. In 2008 it was reported that the growth rate in the number of female students had surpassed that of males in public schools. Rates of women attending private universities are also growing rapidly. At the Carnegie Mellon University in Qatar, for instance, 57% of students are female. Previously male-dominated career paths such as engineering and information technology have been attracting more female participants in recent years. Roughly 40% of students of the Texas A&M University at Qatar, a university geared towards engineering, are women.

Most Qatari women view female education as important for a variety of reasons. Among the forefront of these is to protect themselves from divorce: many young Qatari women are concerned by the country's rising divorce rate, which has been increasing significantly for numerous years, and by about 70% since 2007. The earning of a degree is often perceived by women to be a method of ensuring that, in the event of a divorce, they'll be able to achieve financial self-reliance. Another reason is the growing female Qatari perception of education as a form of women's empowerment — it's viewed as an opportunity to prove their worth to society and to gain true independence for themselves.

Employment
In 2001, Qatar passed the Civil Service Act and Order No. 13 of the Council of Ministers, thereby creating a legal framework protecting of women's rights in the workforce. Another law was passed in 2002 which allowed women retirement benefits as well as granting monetary benefits to widows.==
According to 2014 statistics, there are upwards of 32,000 Qatari women who are employed. This was an increase of over 7,000 from three years earlier in 2011. One quarter of employed Qatari women work in the construction industry, 27% work in the information and technology industry and 45% are employed in social and natural sciences. Most Qatari women work in the public sector. Despite Qatar's female labor force participation rate being the highest in the Gulf Cooperation Council and higher than the world average (as of 2013), the proportion of Qatari women in the workforce still lags slightly behind that of developed countries. In report published by The Wall Street Journal, it was found out that “In the last couple of decades, there has been a quiet transformation in Qatar as women have demonstrated their capacity to be leaders in all fields, including healthcare and medical research.” told Her Excellency Sheikha Hind bint Hamad Al Thani, the Vice Chairperson and CEO of Qatar Foundation. At the moment, 72% of teachers and employees are female in Qatar. In the nation’s universities, women make up the majority of both the teaching staff and the students enrolled in higher education.

Additionally, due to the increasing number of Qatari women attaining university degrees, Qatar's government predicts that employment rates for women will continue an upward trend.

While Qatari women has caught up with men in the public sector, they still lag behind in the private sector. In business, the higher paying jobs typically go to men and Qatar's finance industry is still male dominated. Qatari women do not yet participate in decision-making in fields such as politics, economics and, legislature. They do have decision-making power in certain civil service fields such as education and social affairs.

On 4 July 2022, MENAFN reported that Qatar adopted specific initiatives directed at promoting women's direct involvement in the labor market, in political participation and in decision-making positions. These policies came in the statement delivered by second secretary for the Human Rights Department at the Ministry of Foreign affairs Hissa Al Sulaiti at the 50th session of the Human Rights Council. Al Sulaiti added that Qatar has adopted relevant legislation in the field of protecting women from all manifestations of violence, and has also established specialized institutions such as the Aman center, which operates under Qatar Foundation.

Among the largest obstacles to employment are family obligations, a low number of job openings and inadequate proficiency in English. Societal views also negatively influenced the job opportunities for women, as certain conservative segments of the population consider it improper for women to work in the hospitality industry, as hotel workers and as actresses. Nonetheless, the majority of Qataris view female participation in the labor force as being positive.

Clothing and attire

Women and men are expected to dress in a manner that is modest, but the dress code is generally driven by social customs and is more relaxed in comparison to other nations in the region. Qatari women generally wear customary dresses that include "long black robes" and black head cover "hijab", locally called bo'shiya. However, the more traditional Sunni Muslim clothing for women are the black colored body covering known as the abayah together with the black scarf used for covering their heads known as the shayla.

It is believed that Qatari women began using face masks in the 19th century amid substantial immigration. As they had no practical ways of concealing their faces from foreigners, they began wearing the same type of face mask as their Persian counterparts.

Music
Traditional Qatari folk music is primarily centered on pearling. However, as pearling was an activity exclusive to men, women were not included in this form of singing except for when returning pearl ships were sighted. In this case, they would gather around the seashore where they would clap and sing songs on the hardships of pearl diving.

Women mainly sang songs relating to work activities, such as wheat grinding or embroidery. Some songs were of general themes, while others were of specific processes. Public performances by women were practiced only on two annual occasions. The first was al-moradah, which involved women and girls of all social classes gathering in a secluded area in the desert where they would sing and dance in embroidered clothes. This was usually done in the weeks preceding Eid al-Fitr and Eid al-Adha. The practice was abandoned in the 1950s. The second occasion of collective public singing is known as al-ashori, which refers to performances during weddings. It is still practiced by some classes of Qatari society.

Theatre
Although it is considered taboo to publicly discuss social issues regarding women's rights and their role in Qatari society, theatrical performances have proved to be popular outlets for such discussions. One well-known play commenting on social issues is the 1985 play Ibtisam in the Dock, written by Saleh Al-Mannai and Adil Saqar, which addresses arranged marriage. The story concerns a young girl who, after entering in a secret relationship, professes to her father her disillusionment for past traditions and the suitor her family has arranged for her to marry. Another play, Girls Market by Abdullah Ahmed and Asim Tawfiq, also provides social commentary on arranged marriages. It likens the act of offering women to paying suitors to trading goods on the market, hence associating arranged marriage with materialism.

Crafts
Crafting activities were popular forms of artistic expression in Bedouin society. They also served functional purposes.

Weaving and dyeing

Weaving and dyeing by women played a substantial role in Bedouin culture. The process of spinning sheep's and camel's wool to produce cloths was laborious. The wool was first disentangled and tied to a bobbin, which would serve as a core and keep the fibers rigid. This was followed by spinning the wool by hand on a spindle known as noul. They were then placed on a vertical loom constructed from wood whereupon women would use a stick to beat the weft into place.

The resulting cloths were used in rugs, carpets and tents. Tents were usually made up of naturally colored cloths, whereas rugs and carpets used dyed cloths; mainly red and yellow. The dyes were fashioned from desert herbs, with simple geometrical designs being employed. The art lost popularity in the 19th century as dyes and cloths were increasingly imported from other regions in Asia.

Embroidery

A simple form of embroidery practiced by Qatari women was known as kurar. It involved four women, each carrying four threads, who would braid the threads on articles of clothing - mainly thawbs or abayas. The braids, varying in color, were sewn vertically. It was similar to heavy chain stitch embroidery. Gold threads, known as zari, were commonly used. They were usually imported from India.

Another type of embroidery involved the designing of caps called gohfiahs. They were made from cotton and were pierced with thorns from palm-trees to allow the women to sew between the holes. This form of embroidery declined in popularity after the country began importing the caps.

Khiyat al madrasa, translated as 'school embroidery', involved the stitching of furnishings by satin stitching. Prior to the stitching process, a shape was drawn onto the fabric by a skilled artist. The most common designs were birds and flowers.

Sports

Sports were rarely participated in by women until the 21st century. In 1998, a competition featuring women's athletic events was hosted for the first time in the country by the Qatar Athletics Federation. The competition was sanctioned by the IAAF and was also one of the first major sporting events in Qatar to allow women spectators.

To better integrate women into sports, the Qatar Women's Sport Committee (QWSC) was formed in 2000 as an initiative of Sheikha Moza bint Nasser. The Qatar Olympic Committee accredited the QWSC in 2001. It has the primary aim of achieving gender equality in sport by launching grassroots initiatives.

Until the 2012 Summer Olympics in London, Qatar was one of three countries that had never had a female competitor at the Olympic games.  Qatar eventually sent four women, in swimming (Nada Arkaji), athletics (Noor Hussain Al-Malki), table tennis (Aya Majdi) and shooting (Bahiya Al-Hamad). Bahiya al-Hamad was also set to carry the Qatari flag at the opening ceremony, in what she described as a "truly historic moment".

Social life

Qatar is an Islamic country with the Salafi version of Sunni Islam as the state-sponsored brand of Islam in the country, making Qatar one of the two Salafi states in the Muslim world, along with Saudi Arabia. Societal values of women in Qatar tend to be more liberal than those in Saudi Arabia, and there is less sex segregation.

For social gatherings, women are generally never brought to social events except for western-style gatherings or when the attendees are composed of close relatives. Public schools for girls are separate from public schools for boys. In terms of employment opportunities, women are generally employed in government positions, although women are underrepresented in high-level government positions, with only four women being appointed ministers throughout Qatar's history.

Politics
Women in Qatar vote and may run for public office. Qatar enfranchised women at the same time as men in connection with the 1999 elections for a Central Municipal Council. These elections—the first ever in Qatar—were deliberately held on 8 March 1999, International Women’s Day. It was the first GCC country to enfranchise its population.

Government ministers

Qatar appointed its first female cabinet minister in 2003, when Sheikha Ahmed al-Mahmoud was named as Minister of Education. In 2008, Ghalia bint Mohammed bin Hamad Al Thani was made Minister of Public Health. The third woman government minister was Hessa Al Jaber, who was designated as head of the Ministry of Communication and Technology. Hanan Al Kuwari became the fourth female cabinet member in 2016 when she was made Minister of Public Health.

Consultative Assembly
Members of the Consultative Assembly of Qatar (Majlis ash-Shura) are designated by the Emir of Qatar. In November 2017, Emir Tamim bin Hamad Al Thani appointed four women to the 45-member council, marking the first time women have taken part in the council.

Municipal elections
The Central Municipal Council elections, inaugurated in 1999, are the only free elections to be held in the country. Twenty-nine constituencies are contested. Both sexes are allowed to vote. In the inaugural 1999 edition, candidate Mouza Al Malki became the first female candidate in the GCC to contest a municipal election. Sheikha Yousuf Hasan Al Jufairi became the first female to hold a municipal position when she won the Central Municipal Council (CMC) elections for the Old Airport constituency in 2003. Two women were simultaneously elected to the CMC for the first time in 2015. Only 5 female candidates ran in the election. This invigorated discussion on the possible establishment of a quota for female candidates.

Diplomacy

Alya bint Ahmed Al Thani became the first female ambassador in 2013 when she was appointed as the Permanent Representative to the UN.
Lolwah Al-Khater is the Spokesperson of the Ministry of Foreign Affairs of the State of Qatar since 2017.

Gender equality
Qatari women have made significant legal and social advancements since the 1990s.  Sheikha Mozah has been a vocal advocate for women's issues, supporting women's conferences, higher education opportunities and the creation of a cabinet-level position in the government dedicated to women's concerns. As a result of these advancements, Qatari women have many career opportunities, including leadership positions, in education, banking, charitable projects, health and human services, tourism, law, civil service and even diplomacy.

In 1998, the Women's Affairs Committee was founded as a branch of the Supreme Council for Family Affairs in order to manage the welfare of Qatari women. As well as seeking to uphold women's rights, the committee aims to integrate women into society by providing economic assistance and employment opportunities. Qatar appointed its first female cabinet minister in 2003, and in the same year, a female candidate won the Central Municipal Council (CMC) election for the first time in history. Qatar sent women athletes to the 2012 Summer Olympics that began on 27 July in London.

Labor force participation for women in Qatar is roughly 51%, which is higher than the world average, and is the highest rate in the Arab world. However, both Qatari and non-Qatar women are affected by a wage gap, in which they are paid 25 to 50 percent less than men. In addition, Qatar greatly partakes in social allowances for men which include amenities such as housing, and travel allotments, that female employees are less likely to receive. Experts say women are moving forward with more rights.

See also
Women in Islam
Women in Arab societies

References

Bibliography

External links

 
Qatari women
Qatar